Margaret Caroline Anderson (November 24, 1886 – October 19, 1973) was the American founder, editor and publisher of the art and literary magazine The Little Review, which published a collection of modern American, English and Irish writers between 1914 and 1929. The periodical is most noted for introducing many prominent American and British writers of the 20th century, such as Ezra Pound and T. S. Eliot, in the United States and publishing the first thirteen chapters of James Joyce's then-unpublished novel Ulysses.

A large collection of her papers on Gurdjieff's teaching is now preserved at Beinecke Rare Book and Manuscript Library, Yale University.<ref>Elizabeth Jenks Clark Collection of Margaret Anderson Papers - Biographical info at Yale University Beinecke Rare Book and Manuscript Library.</ref>

 Early life 
Anderson was born in Indianapolis, Indiana, the eldest of three daughters of Arthur Aubrey Anderson and Jessie (Shortridge) Anderson. She graduated from high school in Anderson, Indiana, in 1903, and then entered a two-year junior preparatory class at Western College for Women in Oxford, Ohio.

In 1906 she left college at the end of her freshman year to pursue a career as a pianist. In the fall of 1908 she left home for Chicago, where she reviewed books for a religious weekly (The Continent) before joining The Dial. By 1913 she was a book critic for the Chicago Evening Post.

 The Little Review 

In March 1914, Anderson founded the avant-garde literary magazine The Little Review during Chicago's literary renaissance, which became not just influential, but soon created a unique place for itself and for her in the American literary and artistic history.Margaret Anderson   "The Cambridge Guide to Women's Writing in English", by Lorna Sage, Germaine Greer, Elaine Showalter. Cambridge University Press, 1999. . "Page 16". "An organ of two interests, art and good talk about art", the monthly's first issue featured articles on Nietzsche, feminism and psychoanalysis. Early funding was intermittent, and for six months in 1914, she was forced out of her Chicago residence at 837 West Ainslie Street, and the magazine's offices at Chicago Fine Arts Building at 410 S. Michigan Avenue, and camped with family and staff members on the shores of Lake Michigan.

The writer Ben Hecht, who was at least partly in love with her then, described her this way:
She was blond, shapely, with lean ankles and a Scandinavian face. ... I forgave her her chastity because she was a genius. During the years I knew her she wore the same suit, a tailored affair in robin's egg blue. Despite this unvarying costume she was as chic as any of the girls who model today for the fashion magazines. ... It was surprising to see a coiffure so neat on a noggin so stormy.
In 1916, Anderson met Jane Heap, a spirited intellectual and artist immersed in the Chicago Arts and Crafts Movement, and a former lover to novelist Djuna Barnes. The two became lovers, and Anderson convinced her to become co-editor of The Little Review. Heap maintained a low profile, signing her contributions simply "jh", but she had a major impact on the success of the journal through its bold and radical content.

For a while, Anderson and Heap published the magazine out of a ranch in Muir Woods, across the San Francisco Bay Area, before moving to New York's Greenwich Village in 1917. With the help of critic Ezra Pound, who acted as her foreign editor in London, The Little Review published some of the most influential new writers in the English language, including Hart Crane, T. S. Eliot, Ernest Hemingway, James Joyce, Pound himself, and William Butler Yeats. The magazine's most published poet was New York dadaist Baroness Elsa von Freytag-Loringhoven, with whom Heap became friends on the basis of their shared confrontational feminist and artistic agendas. Other notable contributors included Sherwood Anderson, André Breton, Jean Cocteau, Malcolm Cowley, Marcel Duchamp, Ford Madox Ford, Emma Goldman, Vachel Lindsay, Amy Lowell, Francis Picabia, Carl Sandburg, Gertrude Stein, Wallace Stevens, Arthur Waley, and William Carlos Williams. Even so, however, she once published an issue with a dozen blank pages to protest the temporary lack of exciting new works.

In 1918, starting with the March issue, The Little Review began serializing James Joyce's Ulysses. Over time the U.S. Post Office seized and burned four issues of the magazine, and Anderson and her companion and associate editor, Jane Heap, were convicted of obscenity charges. Although the obscenity trial was ostensibly about Ulysses, Irene Gammel argues that The Little Review came under attack for its overall subversive tone and, in particular, its publication of Elsa von Freytag-Loringhoven’s sexually explicit poetry and outspoken defense of Joyce. During the trial in February, 1921, hundreds of "Greenwich Villagers", men and women, marched into Special Court Sessions; eventually, Anderson and Heap were each fined $100 and fingerprinted.

Life in France

In early 1924, through Alfred Richard Orage, Anderson learned of spiritual teacher George Ivanovitch Gurdjieff, and saw performances of his 'Sacred dances', first at the 'Neighbourhood Playhouse', and later at Carnegie Hall. Shortly after Gurdjieff's automobile accident, Anderson, along with Georgette Leblanc, Jane Heap and Monique Surrere, moved to France to visit him at Fountainebleau-Avon, where he had set up his institute at Château du Prieuré in Avon.Margaret Anderson  Gurdjieff: The Key Concepts, by Sophia Wellbeloved. Published by Routledge, 2003, . Page 246.

Anderson and Heap adopted the two sons of Anderson's ailing sister, Lois. They brought Lois and sons Tom and Arthur "Fritz" Peters to Prieuré in June 1924. After they returned to New York in 1925, the two boys were taken in by Alice B. Toklas and Gertrude Stein.

Later, Anderson moved to Le Cannet on the French Riviera, to live in "le phare de Tancarville", a lighthouse, for many years with the French singer Georgette Leblanc and Lois and her daughter Linda Card.

The final issue of The Little Review was edited at Hotel St. Germain-Des-Pres, 36 rue Bonaparte, Paris.

Anderson published a three-volume autobiography: My Thirty Years' War (1930), The Fiery Fountains, and The Strange Necessity in her last years in Le Cannet. There she wrote her final book, the novel and memoir, Forbidden Fires.

Gurdjieff

The teachings of George Ivanovitch Gurdjieff played an important role in Anderson's life. Anderson met Gurdjieff in Paris and, together with Leblanc, began studies with him, focusing on his original teaching called The Fourth Way. From 1935 to 1939, Anderson and Georgette Leblanc studied with Gurdjieff as part of a group of women known as "The Rope", which included eight members in all: Jane Heap, Elizabeth Gordon, Solita Solano, Kathryn Hulme, Louise Davidson and Alice Rohrer, besides them. Along with Katherine Mansfield and Jane Heap, she remains one of the most noted disciples at Gurdjieff's Institute for the Harmonious Development of Man, at Fontainebleau, near Paris, from October 1922 to 1924.

Anderson studied with Gurdjieff in France until his death in October 1949, writing about him and his teachings in most of her books, most extensively in her memoir, The Unknowable Gurdjieff.

Late life

By 1942 her relationship with Heap had cooled, and, evacuating from the war in France, Anderson sailed for the United States. Jane Heap had moved to London in 1935, where she led Gurdjieff study groups until her death in 1964. With her passage paid by Ernest Hemingway, Anderson met on the voyage Dorothy Caruso, widow of the famous tenor Enrico Caruso. The two began a romantic relationship, and lived together until Dorothy's death in 1955. Anderson returned to Le Cannet, and there she died of emphysema on October 19, 1973. She is buried beside Georgette Leblanc in the Notre Dame des Anges Cemetery.

In media
Anderson was the subject of an Academy Award–nominated documentary entitled Beyond Imagining: Margaret Anderson and the "Little Review" in 1991, by Wendy L. Weinberg.Margaret Anderson -Bibliography The Little Review.

An exhibition, "Making No Compromise: Margaret Anderson and the Little Review", celebrated the life and work of Margaret Anderson and the Little Reviews remarkable influence. It opened at the Beinecke Library, Yale University, in October, 2006, and ran for three months.

Other
In 2006 Anderson and Jane Heap were inducted into the Chicago Gay and Lesbian Hall of Fame.

In 2014, Anderson was inducted into the Chicago Literary Hall of Fame.

Selected works

 1930: My Thirty Years' War: An Autobiography, .
 1951: The Fiery Fountains: The Autobiography: Continuation and Crisis to 1950, .
 1953: The Little Review Anthology, Hermitage House, 1953.
 1959: Margaret C. Anderson Correspondence with Ben and Rose Caylor Hecht.
 1962: The Strange Necessity: The Autobiography, .
 1962: The Unknowable Gurdjieff, memoir, dedicated to Jane Heap. 1962, Arkana. .
 1996: Forbidden Fires, part memoir, part novel, Ed. by Mathilda M. Hills. .

References

Further reading

Published resources

 

Archival resources

 Margaret C. Anderson Papers, 1930-1973 (0.6 cubic feet) are housed at the University of Wisconsin–Milwaukee Archives Department.
 Elizabeth Jenks Clark Collection of Margaret Anderson, 1886-1998 (17.71 linear feet) are housed at the Beinecke Rare Book and Manuscript Library at Yale University.

Bibliography

 Ladies of the Rope: Gurdjieff's Special Left Bank Women's Group, by William Patrick Patterson. Arete Pubns, 1998 . .
 Pound/the Little Review: The Letters of Ezra Pound to Margaret Anderson : the Little Review Correspondence, By Ezra Pound, Thomas L. Scott, Melvin J. Friedman, Jackson R. Bryer. Published by New Directions, 1988. .
 Baggett, Holly A. (ed.) (2000), Dear Tiny Heart: The Letters of Jane Heap and Florence Reynolds, New York University Press
 
 America—Meet Modernism! Women of the Little Magazine Movement: Women of the Little Magazine Movement'', by Barbara Probst Solomon, Sarah. Great Marsh Press, 2003. .

External links

Archives 
Elizabeth Jenks Clark collection of Margaret Anderson papers at Yale University Beinecke Rare Book and Manuscript Library
 The Elizabeth Jenks Clark collection of Margaret Anderson digital collection from the Beinecke Rare Book and Manuscript Library at Yale University
Florence Reynolds collection related to Jane Heap and The Little Review at Special Collections, University of Delaware Library

Other links 
Margaret Anderson and the Little Review
 The Little Review at The Modernist Journals Project
 Gurdjieff and Anderson (Gurdjieff and the Women of The Rope)
 "Unfolding the Corners: Intimacy in the Archive of Margaret Anderson." Netcast about the Elizabeth Jenks Clark collection of Margaret Anderson papers at Yale University Beinecke Rare Book and Manuscript Library

1886 births
1973 deaths
20th-century American women writers
American autobiographers
American literary critics
Women literary critics
American magazine editors
American magazine publishers (people)
20th-century American memoirists
American women memoirists
American spiritual writers
Fourth Way
Lesbian memoirists
LGBT people from Indiana
Miami University alumni
Literary modernism
Writers from Indianapolis
Western College for Women alumni
Students of George Gurdjieff
Women magazine editors
American women critics
American lesbian writers